Håkon Tønsager (31 July 1890 – 15 January 1975) was a Norwegian rower who competed in the 1912 Summer Olympics.

He was the strokeman of the Norwegian boat, which was eliminated in the semi-finals of the coxed fours event. In some sources the crew members of this boat are also listed as bronze medalists.

References

External links
profile

1890 births
1975 deaths
Norwegian male rowers
Olympic rowers of Norway
Rowers at the 1912 Summer Olympics